Hannah Rose Cox (born May 17, 1995), who goes by the stage name Hannah Rose, is an American Christian musician. She released a studio album, Hannah Rose, with Dream Records, in 2013. She is now a country-music artist.

Early life
Hannah Rose was born on May 17, 1995, as Hannah Rose Cox, in Great Falls, Montana, whose father is a pastor, John Joseph Cox, and mother is Wendy Lee Cox (née, Bonewitz). She grew up in Santa Barbara, California, where she was raised with her two siblings, an older sister, Shaina, and a younger sister, Nikki. She is a 2013 graduate of Grace Brethren High School.

Music career
Her music recording career commenced in 2013, with the studio album, Hannah Rose, released by Dream Records on May 7, 2013, just days before her eighteenth birthday. The album was reviewed by Christian Music Zine, CM Addict, Indie Vision Music, Louder Than the Music, and New Release Tuesday.

Personal life
She currently resides in Simi Valley, California, where she attends worship services at New Hope Christian Fellowship.

Discography
Studio albums
 Hannah Rose (May 7, 2013, DREAM)

References

External links
 Official website

1995 births
Living people
American performers of Christian music
Musicians from Montana
Musicians from California
Songwriters from Montana
Songwriters from California
21st-century American women musicians
People from Great Falls, Montana